Rampi Airport is an airport in Rampi, North Luwu Regency, South Sulawesi, Indonesia.

History
In 1979, the Central Sulawesi Christian Church sponsored the construction of a grass airstrip at Rampi, which saw its first landing in 1980 and was used until 1988. After the expiry of the initial contract with the church, the airport initially was abandoned and was reforested, until it was returned to operation with a partnership with the local government in 1990. The second operation period lasted until 1997, and it was again unused until 2003 when the airport was expanded. Subsidized pioneer flights to the airport commenced in 2006.

During its construction in 2003 and more recent works to extend the airport's runway from 1,000 to 1,500 meters, difficulty of land access to Rampi required the employment of significant manual labor by locals, such as the use of wooden carts and shovels, or hauling construction material through the mountainous access route.

Airlines and destinations

References

Airports in South Sulawesi